DOA may refer to:

 Dead on arrival
 Dead or Alive (disambiguation)

Film
 D.O.A. (1949 film), a film noir 
 D.O.A. (1988 film), a remake of the 1949 film 
 D.O.A.: A Rite of Passage (1980 film), a documentary on the genesis of punk rock
 DOA: Dead or Alive, a 2006 film based on the video game series produced by Tecmo

Television
 D.O.A., a 2010 television comedy starring Kris Marshall
 "D.O.A." (Tru Calling), an episode of American drama series Tru Calling
 "D.O.A.", an episode of NBC's crime drama Crossing Jordan
 "DOA for a Day", an episode of CSI: NY
 DOA, the finale of Unforgettable's 3rd season

Music
 D.O.A. (band), a Vancouver punk band
 doa (Japanese band), a rock band from Japan
 Dogs on Acid (also known as DOA), an electronic music website
 Do'a or Do'ah, a musical group founded by Randy Armstrong

Albums
 D.o.A: The Third and Final Report of Throbbing Gristle, an album by Throbbing Gristle
 Dead on Arrival: A Punk Rock Anthology, a live/compilation album by Charged GBH
”The D.O.A Tape”: an album by Kay Flock

Songs
 "D.O.A.", a song by Bloodrock 
 "DOA" (Foo Fighters song), a song by Foo Fighters
 "D.O.A. (Death of Auto-Tune)", a song by Jay-Z
 "D.O.A.", a song by Brotha Lynch Hung from their album Dinner and a Movie
 "D.O.A.", a song by Coroner from No More Color
 "D.O.A.", a song by Dead Moon from 13 Off My Hook
 "D.O.A", a song by Diablo from Mimic47 
 "D.O.A", a song by The Haunted from One Kill Wonder
 "D.O.A.", a song by Lil Wayne from No Ceilings
 "D.O.A.", a song by Loverboy from the album Loverboy
 "D.O.A.", a song by Manilla Road from The Courts of Chaos (album)
 "D.O.A.", a song by Van Halen from Van Halen II 
 "Dead on Arrival" (song), a song by Fall Out Boy
 "Dead on Arrival", a song by Evol Intent from Era of Diversion
 " DOA ", a song by Rich Brian from the ep 1999
 "DOA", a song by I Prevail from Trauma
 "DOA", a remix by I Prevail and Joyner Lucas
 "D.O.A. (Drunk on Arrival)", a song by Johnny Paycheck
 "D.O.A.", a song from The Lightning Thief, The Percy Jackson Musical
 "DOA", a song by Kay Flock and Set Da Trend

Places 

 Doa District, in Mozambique

Other uses
 Dead or Alive (series), a video game series produced by Tecmo and developed by Team Ninja
 wikt:defective on arrival
 Design Organization Approval, an approval granted by European Aviation Safety Agency to design and approve certain changes on aircraft
 Dioctyl adipate, an ester of n-octanol and adipic acid, to form a plasticizer oil
 Direction of arrival
 Disciples of Apocalypse, a biker-themed professional wrestling stable
 Doa (commentator), stage name of esports commentator Erik Lonnquist

Software specific
 Debian on Android, running Debian chrooted on Android.
 Debian on ARM architecture

See also
 Doa (moth)